Bécancour is a city in the Centre-du-Québec region of Quebec, Canada; it is the seat of the Bécancour Regional County Municipality. It is located on the south shore of the Saint Lawrence River at the confluence of the Bécancour River, opposite Trois-Rivières.

Wôlinak, an Abenaki Indian reserve, is an enclave within the town of Bécancour. They arrived from Norridgewock, Maine (formerly Acadia) in the aftermath of Father Rale's War.

There was a small migration of Acadians to the village (1759), after the British began the Expulsion of the Acadians from the Maritimes.  Specifically, the Acadians migrated from present-day New Brunswick to avoid being killed or captured in the St. John River Campaign.

Description
The town of Bécancour was created October 17, 1965, from an amalgamation of eleven municipalities. Bécancour was one of the province of Quebec's first amalgamated cities. At the time, Bécancour was the largest city in Quebec in terms of land area (as of 2003, the title belongs to La Tuque, Quebec).

Bécancour is now divided into six secteurs (lit. "sectors"): Bécancour, Saint-Grégoire, Gentilly, Précieux-Sang, Sainte-Angèle-de-Laval, and Sainte-Gertrude.  Bécancour, Saint-Grégoire and Gentilly, each located near the shore of the Saint Lawrence River, can be considered the main urban centres.  Autoroute 55 intersects Autoroute 30 and Route 132 at Saint-Grégoire.

Bécancour is part of the Trois-Rivières metropolitan area; many residents work in Trois-Rivières and commute across the Laviolette Bridge daily.  The economy of Bécancour, once mainly agricultural, shifted towards heavy industry and manufacturing in the 1970s and 1980s.  An industrial park was built in the area, attracting producers of aluminum, magnesium, refractory metals, and petroleum products; machine shops; and many related services, such as excavators and sales of industrial parts. A nuclear power plant, Gentilly Nuclear Generating Station, was commissioned in 1983 in the Gentilly sector; it was decommissioned in 2012.

Despite its proximity to Trois-Rivières, Bécancour has a vibrant culture and identity of its own.  The city hosts a hot air balloon festival, a weekly public marketplace, a biodiversity museum and interpretation centre, and a maritime pumpkin race.

History 
Constituent municipalities of Bécancour included:

 La Nativité de Notre-Dame-de-Bécancour (1722)
 Saint-Édouard-de-Gentilly (1784)
 Saint-Grégoire-le-Grand (1802)
 Sainte-Gertrude (1845)
 Sainte-Angèle-de-Laval (1868)
 Très-Précieux-Sang-de-Notre-Seigneur (1903)

And the villages of:

 Larochelle (1863)
 Gentilly (1900)
 Villers (1901)
 Bécancour et Laval (1909)

Demographics 

Communities

Bécancour
Gentilly
Précieux-Sang
Sainte-Angèle-de-Laval
Sainte-Gertrude
Saint-Grégoire

Notable people
 Nicolas Perrot (1644–1717), explorer, diplomat, and fur trader.
 Blessed Louis Zephyrinus Moreau, Canadian Roman Catholic priest and fourth Bishop of Saint-Hyacinthe
 Denis Villeneuve, filmmaker, lived in Gentilly.
 Sam Montembeault, hockey player for the Montreal Canadiens

Sister city
  Joué-lès-Tours, France

Emblems and symbols

Floral emblem: Lilac

Bird: Ruby-throated hummingbird

Slogan: De nature énergique("An energetic nature")

See also
List of cities in Quebec
Bas-Richelieu—Nicolet—Bécancour
Gentilly Nuclear Generating Station

References

External links

 Becancour.net: official city website
Bécancour tourism website

Cities and towns in Quebec
Incorporated places in Centre-du-Québec
Quebec populated places on the Saint Lawrence River
Port settlements in Quebec